Erode Corporation is a civic administrative body that governs the City of Erode, India. The Corporation consists of a legislative body, headed by the City Mayor and an executive body headed by the Corporation Commissioner. The Corporation's headquarters is in the Municipal Corporation Building, Erode, near Panneer selvam Park.

History
Erode Municipal Council came into existence in the year of 1871, covering a mere area of around 8.4 km2. In 1917, Periyar E. V. Ramasamy the then Municipal Chairman of Erode has proposed the expansion of town limits by merging the adjoining local bodies such as Veerappan Chatram, Vairapalayam and Periyasemur. But however things were kept only on paper and in 1980 it was upgraded as Special Grade Municipality with the same area of just 8.4 km2.

In 2007, the State Government announced the upgradation of Erode Municipality as a Municipal Corporation. Erode Municipal Corporation started functioning from 2008, administering the same civic limit of 8.4 km2 covering only the Central Business District which had a population of about 1,59,728. In 2011, four Municipalities (Grade-III) of Surampatti, Veerappan Chatram, Periya Semur, Kasipalayam and the Town Panchayats of BP Agraharam and suriyampalayam along with Thindal, Villarasampatti, Gangapuram, Ellapalayam, Lakkapuram, 46 Pudur and Muthampalayam village panchayats were proposed to be merged with Erode Municipal Corporation. Later, Lakkapuram and 46 Pudur Panchayats backed up the plan and the Erode Municipal Corporation expanded to all other civic bodies, over an area of 109.52 km² lying between River Cauvery in the East and NH-544 Bypass in the West, containing more than half-a-million population as per the census of 2011.

Srinivasa Mudaliyar
Srinivasa Mudaliar was an Indian politician and social worker who server as Chairman of Erode municipality for 3 terms. He was the founder of Erode Water works, VOC Park, Erode and present urban structure of Erode.

Chronological List of Chairmen
 A. M. Mac Riker (1871)
 Verner Alexander Brodie (1885–1888)
 K. C. Mahadeva Raja (1888–1891)
 G. M. Dance (1891–1893)
 T. M. Swaminatha Iyer (1893–1897)
 L. G. Moore (1897–1898)
 R. Ramachand Rao (1898–1899)
 M. Young (1899–1900)
 E. L. R. THornson (1900–1901)
 T. V. Gopalasami Iyer (1901–1902)
 Chappan Menon (1902–1903)
 A. W. Brough (1904–1905)
 M. V. Narayanasami Pillai (1905–1906)
 P. S. Singaravelu Pillai (1906–1907)
 A. Rangasamy Iyengar (1907–1908)
 W. H. H. Chatterton (1909–1910)
 U. R. Venkata Rao (1910–1911)
 T. Srinivasa Mudaliyar (1911–1917)
 E. V. Ramasamy Naicker (1917–1920)
 K. A. Kadir Mohideen Saheb (1920–1921)
 S. Sambasivam Pillai (1921–1925)
 T. Srinivasa Mudaliyar (1925–1927)
 K. Balasubbarayalu Naidu (1927–1930)
 Khan Saheb K. A. Sheik Dawood Saheb (1930–1935)
 K.N. Kuppusamy Pillai (1935–1940)
 S. Meenakshisundara Mudaliyar (1953–1955)
 V.R.A. Manika Mudaliar 
 S. Arangarasan (1986-1991 , 1996-2001)
 Ma. subramaiyan (2001–2006)
 K. Kumar Murugesh (2006–2007)

Chronological List of Mayors and Deputy Mayors
 K. Kumar Murugesh & B. Venkatachalam (2008–2011)
 Mallika Paramasivam & K. C. Palanisamy (2011–2016)

Zones and Wards
The area under Erode City Municipal Corporation has been administratively divided into 4 Zones with 15 Sub-divisions (Wards) in each. Each Ward containing nearly 10,000 of population and an average of 1.5lakhs in each Zone. The Corporation Mayor presides over the aligned 60 councillors who represent the 60 wards in the city. The Zonal headquarters were located at Suriyampalayam, Periyasemur, Surampatti and Kasipalayam for Zone-1, 2, 3 & 4 respectively.

References

Erode
Municipal corporations in Tamil Nadu
Government agencies established in 1872
1872 establishments in India
2008 establishments in Tamil Nadu